The 21st Dallas–Fort Worth Film Critics Association Awards honoring the best in film for 2015 were announced on December 14, 2015. These awards "recognizing extraordinary accomplishment in film" are presented annually by the Dallas–Fort Worth Film Critics Association (DFWFCA), based in the Dallas–Fort Worth metroplex region of Texas. The organization, founded in 1990, includes 30 film critics for print, radio, television, and internet publications based in north Texas. The Dallas–Fort Worth Film Critics Association began presenting its annual awards list in 1993.

The Revenant was the DFWFCA's most awarded film of 2015, taking three top honors: Best Actor (Leonardo DiCaprio), Best Director (Alejandro G. Iñárritu), and Best Cinematography (Emmanuel Lubezki). The journalistic tale, Spotlight, won Best Picture and Best Screenplay (Tom McCarthy and Josh Singer).

Winners
Winners are listed first and highlighted with boldface. Other films ranked by the annual poll are listed in order. While most categories saw 5 honorees named, categories ranged from as many as 10 (Best Film) to as few as 2 (Best Cinematography, Best Animated Film, Best Screenplay, and Best Musical Score).

Category awards

Individual awards

Russell Smith Award
 Tangerine, for "best low-budget or cutting-edge independent film"

References

2015
2015 film awards